Donald McRae (born 1961) is a South African writer.

Born in Germiston in 1961, he moved to the United Kingdom in 1984.

McRae is noted as the only two-time winner of the William Hill Sports Book of the Year award with Dark Trade: Lost in Boxing in 1996 (2nd ed. Hamilcar Publications, 2019) and In Black and White: The Untold Story of Joe Louis and Jesse Owens in 2002. His other works include Every Second Counts: the Race to Transplant the First Human Heart (New York: G. P. Putnam's Sons, 2006), The Great Trials of Clarence Darrow: The Landmark Cases of Leopold and Loeb, John T. Scopes, and Ossian Sweet, published in 2009,  A Man’s World: The Double Life of Emile Griffith (Simon & Schuster, 2015), Steven Gerrard: My Story (Joseph/Penguin, 2015), and In Sunshine Or In Shadow: How Boxing Brought Hope In The Troubles.

References

1961 births
Living people
South African writers
People from Germiston
South African expatriates in the United Kingdom
The Guardian people